The 2014 WK League was the sixth season of the WK League, the top division of women's football in South Korea. Incheon Hyundai Steel Red Angels were the defending champions. The regular season began on 17 March 2014 and ended on 18 August 2014. Incheon Hyundai Steel Red Angels won their second consecutive league title.

Teams

Draft
The 2014 WK League Draft was held on 17 December 2013 at the Koreana Hotel in Seoul.

Table

Results

Matches 1 to 14

Matches 15 to 28

Season statistics

Top scorers

Top assists

Play-offs
The semi-final was contested between the 2nd and 3rd placed teams (Goyang Daekyo and Seoul) in the regular season. After defeating Seoul 1–0, Goyang Daekyo advanced to the two-legged final to face the 1st placed team (Incheon Hyundai Steel Red Angels) in the regular season. Goyang Daekyo lost 1–0 on aggregate to Incheon Hyundai Steel Red Angels, who won their second consecutive league title.

Playoff

Championship final
1st leg

2nd leg

Incheon Hyundai Steel Red Angels won 1–0 on aggregate.

References

External links
WK League official website
2014 WK League on RSSSF
2014 WK League on Soccerway

2014
Women